Han Jian (Chinese: 韩简; pinyin: Hán Dìng Bó), ancestral name Jì (姬), clan name Hán (韩), personal name Jiǎn (简), and posthumous name Dìng (定), was the third head of the House of Han. He was the son of Qiubo of Han.

In 645 BC, Duke Mu of Qin invaded Jin at Han Jian's fief. Duke Hui of Jin asked Han Jian to scout the enemy. Han Jian reported that while the enemy had fewer men, their battle strength exceeds that of Jin. Duke Hui did not heed Han Jian's words and sent him to deliver the intent to battle. In the ensuing battle, Duke Hui and Han Jian were both captured and taken to Qin.

Han Jian was succeeded by his son Ziyu of Han.

Ancestors

References

Zhou dynasty nobility
Monarchs of Han (state)